The bantamweight was the third lightest freestyle wrestling weight class held as part of the Wrestling at the 1904 Summer Olympics programme.  It was the first time the event, like all other freestyle wrestling events, was held in Olympic competition.  Seven wrestlers competed.

Results

Louis Strebler and John Cardwell were allowed to fight for the bronze medal as they both lost in this tournament against the gold medalist Isidor Niflot.

References

Sources
 

Wrestling at the 1904 Summer Olympics